Tysvær is a municipality in Rogaland county, Norway. It is part of the Haugalandet region. The municipality is located on the Haugalandet peninsula on the northern side of the Boknafjorden, just east of the towns of Kopervik and Haugesund. The administrative centre of the municipality is the village of Aksdal. Other villages in the municipality include Dueland, Førre, Grinde, Hervik, Hindaråvåg, Nedstrand, Skjoldastraumen, Susort, Tysvær, and Yrke.

The European route E39 highway and European route E134 highways traverse the municipality with their junction located at Aksdal in Tysvær. The Frekasund Bridge on the E39 highway connects the mainland of Tysvær to the island municipality of Bokn to the south. The Karmøy Tunnel connects Tysvær to the town of Kopervik in neighboring Karmøy municipality.

The  municipality is the 231st largest by area out of the 356 municipalities in Norway. Tysvær is the 100th most populous municipality in Norway with a population of 11,283.

General information

The municipality of Tysvær was established in 1849 when it was separated from the large municipality of Skjold. Initially, the municipality had a population of 2,058. During the 1960s, there were many municipal mergers across Norway due to the work of the Schei Committee. On 1 January 1965, the following areas were merged into a newly enlarged municipality of Tysvær:
the old municipality of Tysvær (population: 1,862)
the municipality of Nedstrand (population: 1,200)
the Gismarvik, Førre, and Stegaberg areas of Avaldsnes municipality (population: 994)
the Grinde, Dueland, and Yrkje areas of Skjold municipality (population: 1,133)
the Breidal and Stølsvik farms from Vats municipality (population: 16)
the Hapnes and Dokskar farms from Vikedal municipality (population: 2)

On 1 January 1969, the small Sponevik farm area (population: 6), just north of the village of Skjoldastraumen, was transferred from the neighboring Vindafjord municipality to Tysvær.

Name
The municipality (originally the parish) is named after the old Tysvær farm, since the first Tysvær Church was built there. The first element is the genitive case of the old male name Teitr and the last element is fjörðr which means "fjord".

Coat of arms
The coat of arms was granted on 3 February 1984. The arms show a silver heron on a blue background. The heron was chosen as a symbol for the municipality since there are several large colonies of grey herons in the municipality.

Churches

The Church of Norway has three parishes within the municipality of Tysvær. It is part of the Haugaland prosti (deanery) in the Diocese of Stavanger.

Geography
The municipality lies on the northern shore of the Boknafjorden, with the Skjoldafjorden and Vindafjorden both partially located within the municipality. The island of Borgøy lies in the middle of the Skjoldafjorden in Tysvær.

The lake Aksdalsvatnet is the largest lake in the municipality. Another notable lake is Stakkastadvatnet, which lies on the Haugesund-Tysvær municipal border.

Tysvær has a number of scenic walks including Heggelifjellet and Kvinnesland.

Economy

The Kårstø industrial site is located along the shores of the Boknafjorden in southwestern Tysvær. The site has many natural gas-related facilities including the Kårstø Power Station.

Government
All municipalities in Norway, including Tysvær, are responsible for primary education (through 10th grade), outpatient health services, senior citizen services, unemployment and other social services, zoning, economic development, and municipal roads. The municipality is governed by a municipal council of elected representatives, which in turn elect a mayor.  The municipality falls under the Haugaland og Sunnhordland District Court and the Gulating Court of Appeal.

Municipal council
The municipal council of Tysvær is made up of 29 representatives that are elected to four year terms. Currently, the party breakdown is as follows:

Notable residents
 Cleng Peerson (1783 near Tysvær – 1865)  leader of the first group of Norwegians to emigrate to the United States
 Anders Andersen Bjelland (1790 in Nedstrand – 1850) farmer & politician.
 Asbjørn Kloster (1823 in Vestre Bokn – 1876) a social reformer and leader of the Norwegian temperance movement 
 Lars Hertervig (1830 at Borgøy – 1902) a painter of semi-fantastical works of coastal landscapes
 John S. Tveit (born 1931 in Tysvær) a politician and Mayor of Tysvær, 1967 to 1971
 Nils Olav Fjeldheim (born 1977 in Tysværvåg) sprint and marathon canoeist, bronze medallist, 2004 Summer Olympics
 Peder Losnegård (born 1992 in Tysvær) stage name Lido, a hip hop artist, rapper, producer and songwriter

References

External links

Municipal fact sheet from Statistics Norway 

 
Municipalities of Rogaland
1849 establishments in Norway